Okawa or Ōkawa or Ohkawa may refer to:

People
 Tihiro Ohkawa (1928 - 2014), a Japanese plasma physicist

Places
Japan
Ōkawa, Fukuoka
Ōkawa, Kochi

New Zealand
Okawa Point, Chatham Islands

Other uses
Ōkawa (surname)